The Kreuzbergpass (Sappada German: Kraizpèrk) (1636 m) is a high mountain pass between the provinces of South Tyrol and Belluno in Italy. It connects the Puster Valley with Cadore.

The pass is also the division line between the Dolomites to the west and the Carnic Alps to the northeast.

See also
 List of highest paved roads in Europe
 List of mountain passes

References

External links 

Mountain passes of the Dolomites
Mountain passes of Italy
Mountain passes of South Tyrol
Carnic Alps